James William Emery (January 24, 1934 – December 10, 2021) was an American politician. He served in the South Dakota House of Representatives in 1985 and in the Senate from 1986 to 1996. He is a Cheyenne River Sioux.

References

1934 births
2021 deaths
Republican Party members of the South Dakota House of Representatives
Republican Party South Dakota state senators
Cheyenne River Sioux people
People from Custer, South Dakota